Sega Superstars is a party video game developed by Sonic Team for the PlayStation 2. It was published by Sega and released in Europe on October 22, 2004; in North America in November 2, 2004; and in Japan in November 11, 2004. The game features several minigames based on various Sega titles that are controlled using the EyeToy peripheral. Upon release, the game received "average" review scores from critics.

Gameplay

Gameplay is similar to that of EyeToy: Play, in which players use their body to play a variety of minigames. However, while that game only picked up player's movement, Sega Superstars uses a more advanced system. Before the start of each game, a setup screen with an orange area is shown. In order to start the game, players have to stand in a position where the orange area won't pick up any movement and select the continue button. This method determines what area is the background, allowing EyeToy to pick up the player's position, as opposed to just what areas are moving. This is particularly prominent in games like Puyo Puyo, which uses the player's entire body.

Sega Superstars features 12 minigames, each based on different Sega franchises:
Sonic the Hedgehog - Using their hands, players must guide Sonic through a tube, collecting rings and Chaos Emeralds while avoiding bombs.
Super Monkey Ball - Players use their arms to control Ai-Ai as he rolls in a ball through a maze, aiming to reach a goal without falling off the stage.
Samba de Amigo - Players move their hands over one of the six circles in time to the music.
Space Channel 5 - Playing as Ulala, players must copy dance moves given by the Morolian opponents by hitting monitors with their arms.
NiGHTS into Dreams - Using their arms as if they were flying, players guide NiGHTS through a series of rings and collectables.
The House of the Dead - Players use their body to attack zombies that appear on-screen, being careful not to hit any hostages.
Virtua Fighter - Players fight against various fighters, following command prompts to attack them while also defending against their attacks.
Billy Hatcher - Players must use rolling motions to help Billy Hatcher roll a giant egg around and clear each level.
Puyo Pop Fever - Players use their entire body to funnel colored Puyos into their respective departments, being careful not to accidentally roll in a bomb.
ChuChu Rocket! - Players use their hands to activate mechanisms and guide ChuChus to a rocket while protecting them from a hungry cat.
Virtua Striker - Players play as a soccer goalkeeper and try to catch incoming footballs.
Crazy Taxi - Players attempt to make as much movement and noise as possible to attract the attention of a taxi.

Development
Before Sega Superstars, few games had made use of the EyeToy. As such, the game was developed as a product that would combine the novelty of this accessory with the familiarity of Sega's first-party franchises to extend the long-term viability of the PlayStation 2 console. It was announced in April 2004 and exhibited at the Electronic Entertainment Expo (E3) and Tokyo Game Show events of that same year.

Reception

The game received "average" reviews, according to the review aggregation website Metacritic.  In Japan, Famitsu gave it a score of two nines and two sevens for a total of 32 out of 40.

References

External links

2004 video games
EyeToy games
PlayStation 2 games
PlayStation 2-only games
Sonic Team games
Sega video games
Crossover video games
Party video games
Sonic the Hedgehog video games
Video games developed in Japan